Yeşilçat can refer to:

 Yeşilçat, Bayat
 Yeşilçat, Dinar
 Yeşilçat, Erzincan